Sejida is a suborder of mites in the order Mesostigmata. There are about 5 families and 13 described species in Sejida. The oldest known record of the group is an indeterminate deutonymph belonging to Sejidae from the mid Cretaceous (Albian-Cenomanian) aged Burmese amber of Myanmar.

Families
These five families belong to the suborder Sejida:
 Discozerconidae Berlese, 1910
 Heterozerconidae Berlese, 1892
 Ichthyostomatogasteridae Sellnick, 1953
 Sejidae Berlese, 1885
 Uropodellidae Camin, 1955

References

Further reading

 

Acari